George Farmer is a British aquascaping expert.

Farmer served as a Royal Air Force bomb disposal officer. After serving in Afghanistan, he suffered from PTSD and found that aquascaping helped him. He says that for him, "a well-aquascaped aquarium is the most therapeutic thing you can look at." He started aquascaping in 2002 and made it his career.

Farmer started a Youtube channel for aquascaping enthusiasts, which as of 2018 had 20 000 subscribers, rising to 200 000 as of 2023. He has been a columnist for the aquarium magazine Practical Fishkeeping for more than 10 years. In 2007 he co-founded the UK Aquatic Plants Society, which as of 2018 had 25 000 members.

He is married with 3 children.

References

Bibliography

External links
 
 George Farmer in Practical Fishkeeping
 UK Aquatic Plants Society
 Jane Perrone, Episode 74: Aquascaping with George Farmer, podcast

Living people
20th-century Royal Air Force personnel
21st-century British people
Year of birth missing (living people)
Fishkeeping